"Good Night" is a song by the English rock band the Beatles from their 1968 double album The Beatles (also known as the "White Album"). It was written by John Lennon and credited to Lennon–McCartney. The lead vocalist on the recording is Ringo Starr, who was the only Beatle to appear on the track. The music was provided by an orchestra arranged and conducted by George Martin. Written for Lennon's five-year-old son Julian, "Good Night" is the final song on the White Album.

Composition and recording
John Lennon wrote the song as a lullaby for his five-year-old son Julian.

The original version of "Good Night" featured Starr on lead vocal, George Harrison and John Lennon playing the melody on 
guitars, and Paul McCartney singing a harmony. Take 10 with a guitar part from take 5 was released on the 2018 50th Anniversary box set of The Beatles. 

During rehearsals for the song on 28 June, the band arrangement was reduced to Lennon on piano and Harrison playing percussion. A fragment from this rehearsal and take 22 of the song, along with an overdub of the orchestra from the close of the released version, is heard on the Beatles' 1996 compilation album Anthology 3.
 
Lennon recalled asking George Martin to give the song a lush orchestral arrangement in the style of old Hollywood films and admitted, "Yeah, corny". The orchestra comprised 26 musicians: 12 violins, three violas, three cellos, one harp, three flutes, one clarinet, one horn, one vibraphone and one string bass. Eight members of the Mike Sammes Singers also took part in the recording, providing backing vocals.

With "Good Night", Starr became the third Beatle, after McCartney and Harrison, to record a song credited to the group without the other members performing (Lennon was the fourth with "Julia"). The song ends with Starr whispering: "Good night... Good night, everybody... Everybody, everywhere... Good night".

Reception
In musicologist Walter Everett's view, "Good Night" uses chords that are uncharacteristic of Lennon's writing, and its countermelodies and musical interludes are more typical of Martin's music, particularly the compositions that show the influence of Maurice Ravel, his favourite composer. Everett concludes: "I have difficulty settling into 'Good Night' after 'Revolution 9' dies away, but most no doubt take it as a welcome bromide".

Coinciding with the 50th anniversary of its release, Jacob Stolworthy of The Independent listed "Good Night" at number 28 in his ranking of the White Album's 30 tracks. He called the track "a mediocre song sung by Ringo". He continued: "Despite a vibrant orchestral arrangement from George Martin, 'Good Night'like all lullabiesmight put you to sleep".

Covers and other uses
The song has been covered by several artists, including the Carpenters, Kenny Loggins (feat. Alison Krauss), Kidsongs, Linda Ronstadt and Manhattan Transfer. Barbra Streisand recorded it in 1969 for her album What About Today? In 2006, Cirque du Soleil included a version in their Beatles-themed production Love. Ekkehard Ehlers's track "Plays John Cassavetes 2" (on his 2002 album, Plays) is built from a 6-second instrumental sample from the song.

Personnel
 Ringo Starr – lead vocals
 George Martin – celesta, orchestral arrangement
 The Mike Sammes Singers – backing vocals
 Unnamed session musicians – 12 violins, three violas, three cellos, three flutes, clarinet, horn, vibraphone, double bass, harp

References

Sources

External links

Songs about nights
1968 songs
The Beatles songs
Songs written by Lennon–McCartney
Song recordings produced by George Martin
Songs published by Northern Songs
Barbra Streisand songs
Lullabies
Songs about sleep